Gilles Aillaud (1928 in Paris – 24 March 2005 in Paris) was an internationally known French painter, set decorator, and scenographer; as well, he was one of the main proponents of the Nouvelle Figuration and Figuration Narrative schools of art.

References
This article was based on portions of the equivalent article on the French Wikipedia.
Gilles Aillaud at the  ENCYCLOPEDIE AUDIOVISUELLE DE L'ART CONTEMPORAIN

External links
Gilles Aillaud Paintings Gallery (Public Domain Paintings - www.art.onilm.com)
2015 major retrospective of Gilles Aillaud held at the Estrine Museum
Portrait of Gilles Aillaud by Braun-Vega (1979).

1928 births
2005 deaths
Painters from Paris
20th-century French painters
20th-century French male artists
French male painters
21st-century French painters
21st-century French male artists
French set decorators
Scenographers